Nakai is an Ok language of West Papua. Two of the three dialects, which pronounce the ethnonym Nagi, may be a distinct language.

References

Languages of western New Guinea
Ok languages